This is a list of  parks and gardens, open to the general public, in Malta and Gozo by locality:

Attard

Attard Local Council Garden (Ġnien Kunsill Lokali)
Emvin Cremona Garden (Ġnien Emvin Cremona)
Europa Government Nursery 
Fr. Carmelo Pace Garden (Ġardina Dun Karm Pace)
George Zammit Garden (Ġnien Ġorġ Zammit)
Idward Garden (Ġnien Tal-Idward)
Kola Square Garden (Ġnien Misraħ Kola)
Palm Garden (Ġnien il-Palma)
Pierre Muscat Grove (Masġar Pierre Muscat)
Railway Station Garden (Ġnien l-Istazzjon)
Reservoir's Garden (Ġardina Tal-Ġibjun)
San Anton Gardens (Ġnien Sant'Anton)
Ta' Qali National Park (Park Nazzjonali Ta' Qali)
Tal-Fuklar Garden (Ġnien Tal-Fuklar)
Villa Bologna Gardens

Birgu

Birgu Ditch (Il-Foss tal-Birgu)

Birkirkara

Blessed Ignatius Falzon Garden (Ġnien Venerabli Nazju Falzon)
Paul Borg Olivier Garden (Ġnien Pawlu Borg Olivier)
Railway Track Garden (Ġnien Stazzjon)

Birżebbuġa

Mgr. Ġużeppi Minuti Garden (Ġnien Mons. Ġużeppi Minuti)
St. George's Garden (Ġnien San Ġorġ)
Tal-Papa Garden (Ġnien Tal-Papa)

Bormla

Cottonera Gardens

Dingli

Monument Square (Misraħ il-Mafkar)
Workers' Garden (Ġnien tal-Ħaddiema)

Fgura

Reggie Miller Gardens (Wesgħa Reggie Miller)

Floriana

Argotti Botanic Gardens
Herbert Ganado Gardens
Il-Biskuttin 
Jubilee Grove (Masġar il-Ġublew)
King George V Recreational Grounds (Ġnien Re Ġorġ V)
Maglio Gardens (Il-Mall)
Milorda Gardens (Ġnien tal-Milorda)
Preziosi Gardens (Ġnien Preziosi)
St. Philip's Gardens (Ġnien San Filippu)

Għajnsielem

Amabile Cauchi Playing Field (Bandli Amabile Cauchi)
Visitation Square (Pjazza d-Dehra)

Għaxaq

Ħas-Saptan
St. Rocco Playing Field (Bandli Santu Rokku)

Gudja

Raymond Caruana Garden (Ġnien Raymond Caruana)
Xlejli Garden (Ġnien Ta' Xlejli)

Gżira

European Council Garden (Ġnien il-Kunsill tal-Ewropa)
Scicluna Garden (Ġnien Memè Scicluna)

Ħamrun

Anton Buttigieg Garden (Ġnien Anton Buttigieg)
John Mizzi Grove (Masġar John Mizzi)
Oreste Kirkop Garden (Ġnien Oreste Kirkop)

Iklin

Ninu Cremona Square (Pjazza Ninu Cremona)

Isla

Gardjola Garden (Ġnien il-Gardjola)
Safe Haven Garden

Kalkara

Archbishop Gonzi Square (Misraħ l-Arċisqof Gonzi)
Our Saviour's Garden (Ġnien is-Salvatur)

Luqa

Youths Square (Misraħ iż-Żgħażagħ)

Marsa

Belvedere Garden (Ġnien Belvedere)
Għammieri Farm
Juan Mamo Garden (Ġnien Juan Mamo)
Spencer Gardens (Ġnien Spencer)

Marsaskala

Friendship Park 
Il-Magħluq Park
Mifsud Bonnici Playing Field (Bandli Mifsud Bonnici)
St. Thomas Bay Garden (Ġnien il-Bajja ta' San Tumas)
Żonqor Playing Field (Bandli taż-Żonqor)

Marsaxlokk

Magħluq Playing Field (Bandli tal-Magħluq)
Roman Port Garden (Ġnien il-Port Ruman)
Xrobb l-Għaġin Nature Park (Park Xrobb l-Għaġin)

Mdina

Hira Gardens (Ġnien Ħira)
Howard Gardens (Ġnien Howard)
Mdina Ditch (Il-Foss tal-Imdina)
Saqqajja Playing Field (Bandli Tas-Saqqajja)

Mellieħa

L-Aħrax tal-Mellieħa 
Fr. Anton Debono Garden (Ġnien Dun Anton Debono)
Gate's Garden (Ġnien Ta' Xatba)
Għadira Nature Reserve 
Ingraw Gardens (Ġnien Ingraw)
Majjistral Park (Manikata)
Qigħan Garden (Ġnien il-Qigħan)
Tas-Salib Square (Misraħ Tas-Salib)
Wesgħa Narċis

Mosta

15 October Garden (Ġnien 15 ta' Ottubru)
Mosta Bride's Garden (Ġnien l-Għarusa tal-Mosta)
Reggie Cilia Garden (Ġnien Reggie Cilia)
San Ġużepp tat-Tarġa

Mqabba

The Small Mission Square (Misraħ il-Missjoni ż-Żgħira)

Msida

Misraħ il-Menqa
Wied Għollieqa Nature Reserve

Mtarfa

Mtarfa Belvedere Garden

Nadur

Nadur Local Council Garden (Ġnien Kunsill Lokali Nadur)
San Blas Garden (Ġnien San Blas)
Ta' Kenuna Garden (Ġnien Ta' Kenuna)
Tal-Ħali Playing Field (Bandli Tal-Ħali)

Naxxar

Cherry Garden (Ġnien Ċirasa)
Palazzo Parisio Gardens
Soil Garden (Ġnien il-Ħamrija)

Paola

Lorry Sant Garden (Ġnien Lorry Sant)
Mediterranean Gardens (Ġnien il-Mediterran) - formerly called Gaddafi Gardens (Ġnien Gaddafi) or Libyans' Garden (Ġnien il-Libjani)
Mgr. Frances Xuereb Garden (Ġnien Mons. Franġisku Xuereb)
Sir Paul Boffa Garden (Ġnien Sir Pawlu Boffa)

Pembroke

4 July Garden (Ġnien l-4 ta' Lulju)
Pembroke Garden (Ġnien Pembroke)

Qala

Family's Garden (Ġnien Tal-Familja)
Magistrate Saviour Attard Garden (Ġnien il-Maġistrat Salvu Attard)

Qormi

De La Cruz Avenue Garden (Ġnien f'Vjal De La Cruz)
Maemple Square (Pjazza Maemple)
Robert Hyzler Garden (Ġnien Bertu Hyzler)
War Victims' Garden (Ġnien il-Vittmi tal-Gwerra)

Qrendi

Commander's Garden (Ġnien tal-Kmand)
Dame Cecilia Pick Garden (Ġnien Dame Cecilia Pick)

Rabat

Buskett Gardens 
Chadwick Lakes

Safi

13 April Garden (Ġnien it-13 ta' April)
Sir Alexander Ball's Garden (Ġnien Alexander Ball)
Fr. Carmelo Vella Garden (Ġnien Dun Karm Vella)

San Ġiljan

Balluta Square (Pjazza Balluta)
Spinola Palace Garden (Ġnien tal-Palazz ta' Spinola)

San Ġwann

George Zarb Garden (Ġnien George Zarb)
Karin Grech Garden (Ġnien Karin Grech)
Victoria Gardens Playingfield

San Pawl il-Baħar

Anton Buttigieg Garden (Ġnien Anton Buttigieg)
Kennedy Grove 
Simar Nature Reserve

Santa Luċija

Chinese Garden of Serenity (Ġnien is-Serenità)
Santa Lucia Garden (Ġnien Santa Luċija)

Santa Venera

Romeo Romano Gardens (Ġnien Romeo Romano)
St. George Preca Garden (Ġnien San Ġorġ Preca)

Siġġiewi

Buskett Gardens (Il-Buskett)
Città Ferdinand Square (Pjazza Ċittà Ferdinand)

Sliema

George Bonello du Puis Garden (Ġnien George Bonello du Puis)
Independence Garden (Ġnien l-Indipendenza)

Tarxien

Joan's Garden (Ġnien Joan)
Mark Farrugia Garden (Ġnien Mark Farrugia)
Tarxien Local Council Garden (Ġnien Kunsill Lokali Tarxien)

Valletta

Hastings Gardens (Ġnien ta' Hastings)
Lower Barrakka Gardens (Il-Barrakka t'Isfel)
Upper Barrakka Gardens (Il-Barrakka ta' Fuq)

Victoria

Villa Rundle

Xagħra

European Council Garden (Ġnien il-Kunsill tal-Ewropa)

Xewkija

Castelvenere Garden (Ġnien Castelvenere)
Council Garden (Ġnien il-Kunsill)

Żabbar

Żabbar Playing Field (Bandli Żabbar)
Il-Masġar taż-Żebbuġ
Wesgħa quddiem Bieb is-Sultan

Żebbuġ, Gozo

Qbajjar Gardens (Ġnien il-Qbajjar)

Żejtun

Circles' Garden (Ġnien iċ-Ċrieki)
Ġebel San Martin Garden (Ġnien Ġebel San Martin)
Luqa Briffa Garden (Ġnien Luqa Briffa) - also known as the Commander's Garden (Ġnien tal-Kmand)
Mikiel Anton Vassalli Garden (Ġnien Mikiel Anton Vassalli)
Rainbow's Garden (Ġnien il-Qawsalla)
St. Gregory's Garden (Ġnien San Girgor)
Ta' Brejgu Garden (Ġnien Ta' Brejġu)
Youth Garden (Ġnien iż-Żgħożija)

Żurrieq

Belvedere Garden (Ġnien Belvedere)
European Council Garden (Ġnien il-Kunsill tal-Ewropa)
Żurrieq's Children Garden (Ġnien Tfal taż-Żurrieq)

References

Malta
Malta
Gozo
 
Malta geography-related lists
Parks and gardens